Eliza Kathryn Doddridge (born 15 February 1999) is an Australian cricketer who plays as a right-handed batter and occasional right-arm medium bowler. She last played for the South Australian Scorpions in the Women's National Cricket League. She made her Scorpions debut on 22 September 2018 against Victoria, scoring 15* and taking one catch. She made her first half-century on 11 November 2018, scoring 54* against Queensland Fire. Doddridge was a member of the Adelaide Strikers squad for the 2018–19 Women's Big Bash League season but did not make an appearance.

References

External links

1999 births
Adelaide Strikers (WBBL) cricketers
Australian women cricketers
Cricketers from Adelaide
Living people
South Australian Scorpions cricketers